Ryan William Walter (born April 23, 1958) is a Canadian former professional ice hockey centre who played 15 seasons in the National Hockey League.   He won the 1986 Stanley Cup with the Montreal Canadiens.

He was also an assistant coach with the Vancouver Canucks, head coach of the Canadian National Women's hockey team, a hockey broadcaster and president of the Abbotsford Heat of the American Hockey League.

Early life
Walter was born in New Westminster, British Columbia, but grew up in Burnaby, British Columbia. As a youth, he played in the 1971 Quebec International Pee-Wee Hockey Tournament with a minor ice hockey team from Burnaby.

NHL career
Walter was drafted second overall by the Washington Capitals in the 1978 NHL Amateur Draft. At the time the Capitals named him as team captain in his second season, he was the youngest player in the history of the NHL to hold that position.

In September 1982, Walter and Rick Green were traded to the Montreal Canadiens as part of a six-player blockbuster deal in exchange for Brian Engblom, Doug Jarvis, Rod Langway and Craig Laughlin. Walter's name is engraved on the Stanley Cup, which the Canadiens won in 1986 though Walter was injured for most of the playoffs.  In the 1989 Stanley Cup Finals, he scored in the second overtime period of game three to give the Canadiens a 2–1 series lead. However, the Calgary Flames came back to win the series and the Cup.  In 1991, he signed as a free agent with the Vancouver Canucks, where he played the final two seasons of his career and won the Budweiser NHL Man of the Year Award in 1992. He was known as a tough, hard-working player who was excellent in the face-off circle. Walter also served as vice president of the NHLPA.

Broadcasting career
From 1993–94 until 1997–98, he worked for TSN as the network's secondary hockey colour commentator.  In this role, he worked on NHL, CHL, and IIHF broadcasts.  He worked five Memorial Cups, one World Junior Hockey Championship, and four World Hockey Championships. From 1996–97 until 2001–02, he was the colour commentator on Vancouver Canucks television broadcasts on BCTV, Rogers Sportsnet and VTV. He also occasionally filled in on radio when Tom Larscheid had football duties. In these roles, he was teamed up with, at various times, Jim Robson, Jim Hughson and John Shorthouse.

Coaching career
On June 17, 2008, Walter was named an assistant coach to Alain Vigneault of the Vancouver Canucks. He was relieved of his duties after the 2009–10 season. On September 21, 2010, Walter was named head coach of Canada's women's hockey team which won the gold medal at the 2010 Four Nations Cup.

Front office
Walter served as the president of the Abbotsford Heat of the American Hockey League, which was the minor-league affiliate of the Calgary Flames from 2011 to 2014.

Personal life
Walter is a motivational speaker, author and leadership expert, using his experiences in hockey to relate to business and success.

Walter also had a cameo appearance in the movie Miracle, playing the referee in the game between the US and USSR in Lake Placid and was hired by Disney to be a hockey expert for the movie. He was also hired as a hockey expert for both seasons of Making the Cut: Last Man Standing, a Nike hockey commercial, and played himself on an episode of the Canadian animated television series Being Ian.

Walter and his wife, Jennifer have three sons who are also hockey players.  His oldest son, Ben, was drafted by the Boston Bruins and played 24 games in the NHL. Joey played with the Langley Chiefs of the BCHL and the Trinity Western University Spartans, and his other son, Ryan Jr., played for the TWU Titans in 2006-07 and 2007–08 as well as the Liberty University club hockey team.

Career statistics

Regular season and playoffs

International

Awards
 WCHL First All-Star Team – 1978

See also
List of NHL players with 1000 games played

References

External links

1958 births
Calgary Wranglers (WHL) players
Canadian ice hockey centres
Ice hockey people from British Columbia
Kamloops Chiefs players
Langley Lords players
Living people
Members of the Christian and Missionary Alliance
Montreal Canadiens players
National Hockey League All-Stars
National Hockey League broadcasters
National Hockey League first-round draft picks
Seattle Breakers players
Sportspeople from Burnaby
Sportspeople from New Westminster
Stanley Cup champions
Vancouver Canucks announcers
Vancouver Canucks coaches
Vancouver Canucks players
Washington Capitals captains
Washington Capitals draft picks
Washington Capitals players
Canadian ice hockey coaches
Calgary Flames announcers